Monae Johnson is an American politician from South Dakota. A Republican, she is the South Dakota Secretary of State.

Johnson worked for the office of the South Dakota Secretary of State for eight years. She announced her candidacy for the 2022 election for secretary of state in February 2022. She challenged the incumbent, Steve Barnett, for the Republican nomination at the Republican convention on June 25, and won the nomination. During the campaign, Johnson refused to acknowledge that Joe Biden was the legitimate winner of the 2020 United States presidential election. She defeated Democrat Tom Cool in the November 8 general election. Barnett resigned from office in December, and Governor Kristi Noem appointed Johnson to the office effective December 5, and her own term began on January 2.

References

|-

Living people
Secretaries of State of South Dakota
South Dakota Republicans
Women in South Dakota politics
Year of birth missing (living people)